This is a list of career statistics of Czech professional tennis player Karolína Plíšková since her professional debut in 2006. Plíšková has won 16 singles titles, including two WTA Premier 5 titles in Cincinnati and Rome. Plíšková has also won five doubles titles, including one at Premier level with fellow Czech Barbora Strýcová.

Performance timelines

Only main-draw results in WTA Tour, Grand Slam tournaments, Fed Cup/Billie Jean King Cup and Olympic Games are included in win–loss records.

Singles
Current through the 2023 BNP Paribas Open.

Doubles
Current through the 2023 BNP Paribas Open.

Grand Slam finals

Singles: 2 (2 runner-ups)

Other significant finals

WTA Elite Trophy

Singles: 1 (runner-up)

WTA 1000 finals

Singles: 7 (2 titles, 5 runner-ups)

Doubles: 1 (runner-up)

WTA career finals

Singles: 32 (16 titles, 16 runner-ups)

Doubles: 7 (5 titles, 2 runner-ups)

Team competition finals

Billie Jean King Cup: 2 (2 titles)

ITF finals

Singles: 16 (10 titles, 6 runner-ups)

Doubles: 12 (6 titles, 6 runner-ups)

Junior Grand Slam finals

Girls' singles: 1 (1 title)

WTA Tour career earnings
Correct after the 2023 Qatar Open.
{|cellpadding=3 cellspacing=0 border=1 style=border:#aaa;solid:1px;border-collapse:collapse;text-align:center;
|-style=background:#eee;font-weight:bold
|width="90"|Year
|width="100"|Grand Slam <br/ >titles|width="100"|WTA <br/ >titles
|width="100"|Total <br/ >titles
|width="120"|Earnings ($)
|width="100"|Money list rank
|-
|2013
|0
|2
|2
| align="right" |296,840
|87
|-
|2014
|0
|5
|5
| align="right" |768,635
|34
|-
|2015
|0
|1
|1
| align="right" |1,658,155
|18
|-
|2016
|0
|3
|3
| align="right" |3,976,093
| bgcolor="eee8aa" |5
|-
|2017
|0
|3
|3
| align="right" |3,902,665
| bgcolor="eee8aa" |7
|-
|2018
|0
|2
|2
| align="right" |3,539,050
| bgcolor="eee8aa" |8
|-
|2019
|0
|4
|4
| align="right" |5,138,077
| bgcolor="eee8aa" |6
|-
|2020
|0
|1
|1
| align="right" |888,916
|15
|-
|2021
|0
|0
|0
| align="right" |2,868,865
|bgcolor=eee8aa|4
|-
|2022
|0
|0
|0
| align="right" |1,024,297
|35
|-
|2023
|0
|0
|0
| align="right" |420,912
|14
|- style="font-weight:bold;"
|Career
|0
|21
|21
| align="right" |24,715,507
|13
|}

Career Grand Slam statistics

Seedings
The tournaments won by Plíšková are in boldface, and advanced into finals by Plíšková are in italics.

Best Grand Slam results details
Grand Slam winners are in boldface', and runner–ups are in italics.''

Record against other players

No. 1 wins

Record against top 10 players 

 She has a 38–46 record against players who were, at the time the match was played, ranked in the top 10.

Notes

References

External links
 
 
 Karolína Plíšková at CoreTennis

Pliskova, Karolina